Dr Cian O'Neill is an Irish former Gaelic footballer who has since been a Gaelic games coach (physical trainer), selector and manager with various county teams. He has been attached to the Galway county football team, under Pádraic Joyce, since 2021.

O'Neill trained the Tipperary county hurling team that won the 2010 All-Ireland Senior Hurling Championship. After involvement with the Mayo and Kerry county football teams, he served as manager of the Kildare county football team for several years.

Career
O'Neill is originally from Newbridge, County Kildare. He played football for Kildare GAA club Moorefield but his career was cut short by serious back injury.

O'Neill has coached both the Tipperary county hurling team and the Kerry county football team. As well as the Mayo county football team, after Tipperary and before Kerry and while with Kerry he was also a selector. While with Kerry he was involved in the documentary All Ireland Day.

O'Neill was a member of Liam Sheedy's management team that won the 2009 Munster Senior Hurling Championship. The team also reached the 2009 All-Ireland Senior Hurling Championship Final but lost to Kilkenny. O'Neill was also the Tippeary trainer when the county won the 2010 All-Ireland Senior Hurling Championship Final and was runner-up in 2011. At the end of September 2011 he left the Tipperary panel after being involved for four years.

O'Neill later served as manager of the senior Kildare county team between 2015 and 2019.  He was a lecturer at the Department of Physical Education and Sports Science in UL and in September 2013 was appointed as Head of Department of Sports, Leisure and Childhood Studies at Cork Institute of Technology.

He joined the Galway county football team as coach under the management of Pádraic Joyce ahead of the 2022 season.

References

External links
 Tipperary Player Profiles

Year of birth missing (living people)
Living people
Academics of the University of Limerick
Gaelic football coaches
Gaelic football managers
Gaelic football selectors
Galway county football team
Hurling coaches
Kerry county football team
Kildare Gaelic footballers
Mayo county football team
Moorefield Gaelic footballers
Tipperary county hurling team